Wang Jisi (Chinese: 王缉思) is President of the Institute of International and Strategic Studies at Peking University. He was Dean of the School of International Studies at Peking University from 2005 to 2013. He has been Peking University Boya Chair Professor since 2017. He is also honorary president of the Chinese Association for American Studies.

Early life
Wang was born in Guangzhou in 1948. He worked as a farm laborer from 1968 to 1978, then obtained a MA degree at Peking University in 1983.

Career
Wang taught at the Peking University Department of International Politics from 1983 to 1991. Wang was a visiting academic at Oxford University (1982–83), University of California, Berkeley (1984–85), University of Michigan (1990–91), and Claremont McKenna College (2001).

From 1992 to 2005, Wang was Director of the Institute of American Studies, at the Chinese Academy of Social Sciences; he was invited to the S. Rajaratnam School of International Studies as endowed chair from 21 to 25 February and from 2 to 8 March 2002. at what was then known as Institute of Defence and Strategic Studies, within Nanyang Technological University.

Wang was Dean of the School of International Studies at Peking University from 2005 to 2013, then President of the Institute of International and Strategic Studies, a think tank affiliated with Peking University. He was concurrently director of the Institute of International Strategic Studies at the Central Party School of the Chinese Communist Party from 2001 to 2009.

From 2008 to 2016 he was a member of the Foreign Policy Advisory Committee of the Ministry of Foreign Affairs of the People's Republic of China.

He was Global Scholar at Princeton University from 2011 to 2015, including 9 months at the Woodrow Wilson School of Public and International Affairs.

Wang was on the International Crisis Group Board of Trustees. Wang has served on the board of directors of the nonprofit Teach For China.

Wang has published numerous English articles in the fields of U.S. foreign policy, China’s foreign relations, Asian security, and global politics.

Awards
In 2005 and again in 2012 Foreign Policy named Wang one of its Top 100 Global Thinkers.

References

External links
Yoichi Kato Interview with Wang Jisi: China deserves more respect as a first-class power The Asahi Shinbun, October 5, 2012 
Wang Jisi, “Xi jin: zhong guo di yuan zhan lue de zai ping heng (‘Marching Westwards’: The Rebalancing of China’s Geostrategy)," Global Times, October 17, 2012
Marching Westwards: The Rebalancing of China’s Geostrategy

Living people
Academic staff of Peking University
1948 births
Chinese international relations scholars